The Ellen Eccles Theatre was built in 1923 on Logan, Utah's Main Street.  Then known as the Capitol Theatre, it was a home originally to vaudeville and opera.  As vaudeville died out, it became used primarily for community events and, increasingly, movies.  By the 1980s, the Capitol had fallen into disrepair and become a run-down home for second-run movies.

In 1988, it seemed likely that the Capitol would be demolished and turned into a parking lot. Michael Ballam led the charge to save this historic theater and united citizens of Logan in a heroic effort to restore it. His efforts led to the city of Logan receiving the theatre as a gift from S. Eugene Needham, and a not-for-profit organization was formed to renovate and operate it, now known as the Cache Valley Center for the Arts. This restoration effort hit a setback in 1990 when fire destroyed much of the theater's annex.  However, work continued, and the house, christened the Ellen Eccles Theatre after the family member of one of the principal philanthropists, opened to a gala performance on January 8, 1993.

The theatre, which seats approximately 1100, is used for concerts, community theatre, and ballet performances, and classic movies as well as being a popular stop for many national touring acts each year.  It is the venue for performances of the Utah Festival Opera Company for 4 weeks in the summer, and dozens of performances during the rest of the year by the Cache Valley Civic Ballet, Music Theatre West, Valley Dance Ensemble, Cache Theatre Company, and several Utah State University performing groups.

References

External links
Cache Valley Center for the Arts
Cache Theatre Company

Theatres in Utah
Buildings and structures in Logan, Utah
Theatres completed in 1923
Tourist attractions in Cache County, Utah
1923 establishments in Utah